Frederick Stocks (23 May 1883 – 2 January 1954) was an English cricketer.  Stocks' batting and bowling styles are unknown.  He was born at Shireoaks, Nottinghamshire.

Stocks made two first-class appearances for Northamptonshire in 1906 against Cambridge University and the touring West Indians.  In the match against Cambridge University at Fenner's, Stocks top scored in Northamptonshire's first-innings with 13, before being dismissed by Percy May, with Northamptonshire being dismissed for 57.  In their second-innings he was dismissed for 3 by Cyril Rattigan.  He also bowled seven wicketless overs in Cambridge University's first-innings.  In the match against the West Indians at the County Ground, he scored 2 runs in Northamptonshire's first-innings, before being dismissed by Sydney Smith.  In their second-innings he scored 6 runs, before being dismissed by Richard Ollivierre.

He died at Hucknall, Nottinghamshire on 2 January 1954.  His son, also called Frederick, was a first-class cricketer for Nottinghamshire from 1946 and 1957.

References

External links
Frederick Stocks at ESPNcricinfo
Frederick Stocks at CricketArchive

1883 births
1954 deaths
People from Shireoaks
Cricketers from Nottinghamshire
English cricketers
Northamptonshire cricketers